This is a list of yearly Rocky Mountain Athletic Conference football standings.

Standings

Colorado Faculty Athletic Conference (1909)

Rocky Mountain Conference (1910–1966)

Rocky Mountain Athletic Conference (1967–present)

References

Standings
Rocky Mountain Athletic Conference